HMS Princess Louisa was a 58-gun fourth rate ship of the line of the Royal Navy, built to the dimensions prescribed in the 1741 proposals of the 1719 Establishment at Limehouse, and launched on 1 July 1744.

The ship was under the command of William Lloyd in the Louisbourg Expedition (1757).

Princess Louisa served until 1766, when she was broken up.

Notes

References

Lavery, Brian (2003) The Ship of the Line – Volume 1: The development of the battlefleet 1650–1850. Conway Maritime Press. .

Ships of the line of the Royal Navy
1744 ships